"Call Me" is a song composed by Tony Hatch for an original recording for Petula Clark.  It was later an easy listening standard via a hit version by Chris Montez.

"Call Me" first appeared as the title cut on a Petula Clark EP released in 1965 by Pye in the UK. "Call Me" and the three other tracks on the EP: "Heart", "Everything in the Garden" and "Strangers and Lovers" were also released on Clark's album I Know a Place  (a.k.a. The New Petula Clark Album).

Chris Montez Recording
Also in 1965 Chris Montez, who had scored the hit "Let's Dance" in 1962 and subsequently dropped out of the music business, was invited to resume recording by A&M Records' founder Herb Alpert. Alpert was unhappy when Montez began recording for A&M in his previous Chicano rock style and personally suggested Montez shift to easy listening choosing "Call Me" as the song to be Montez's debut single on A&M. Released in November 1965, "Call Me" entered the Easy Listening Top 40 in Billboard that December entering the Billboard Hot 100 in January 1966; that March "Call Me" peaked on the Easy Listening chart at #2 and on the Hot 100 at #22.

Montez's version of "Call Me" was released as a single in the UK on the Pye label in January 1966 but failed to chart.

Chart performance

References

External links
Lyrics

1965 songs
1965 singles
1966 singles
Petula Clark songs
Chris Montez songs
Frank Sinatra songs
Trini Lopez songs
Shirley Bassey songs
Songs written by Tony Hatch
Pye Records singles
A&M Records singles
Song recordings produced by Tony Hatch